The Valley Preferred Cycling Center (VPCC), also known as the Lehigh Valley Velodrome or simply T-Town, is a professional cycling center and a velodrome located in Breinigsville, Pennsylvania. It serves as the Lehigh Valley's main track cycling stadium. The velodrome is operated by Velodrome Fund, a non-profit organization. that promotes competitive cycling, youth fitness, and adult wellness activities for the Lehigh Valley.

The velodrome hosted has hosted various cycling championships. VPCC is the home of the World Series of Bicycling. The Velodrome annually hosts the USA Cycling Elite Nationals qualifying event. The center also features a Cycling Hall of Fame. Over the past 40 years, the center introduced tens of thousands of people to cycling, producing over 140 national champions, seven world champions, and three Olympic medalist.

History 

The velodrome was launched in the early 1970s by Robert Rodale, publisher of Rodale, Inc. in nearby Emmaus. Rodale became interested in cycling while competing in the Pan-American Games in Winnipeg, Canada in 1967.  In 1974 construction broke ground on the plot of land that was owned by Bob Rodale and his wife, Ardath. The first race was held on October 12, 1975. The Velodrome was originally called the Lehigh County Velodrome or simply T-town (due to its close proximity to Trexlertown). The center underwent a number of renovations which added rest rooms, seats for the fans, a podium, showers, and changing rooms.

In 1995, the center underwent a major $2.5M renovations in preparation for the 1996 Summer Olympics cycling trials.  In 2008, extensive repairs and resurfacing were done to the Velodrome.

In 2007, Valley Preferred Health Network bought the naming rights to the center, and the velodrome's name became Valley Preferred Cycling Center.

In 2008, the town of Breinigsville offered land to expand the center to include a hall of fame. Today, the center is part of a 103-acre Bob Rodale Cycling and Fitness Park.

Competitions 
The center hosted various competitions over the years including the UCI Track Cycling World Cup and the UCI Juniors Track World Championships. It is the home of the World Series of Bicycling, a series of races every Friday night between Memorial Day and Labor Day and the annual USA Cycling Elite Nationals qualifying event. Additionally many other smaller regional, national championships and international competitions also take place, bringing many track cyclists from across North and South America. Most recently, the VPCC hosted the 2016 USA Cycling Eilte and Junior National Track Championships.

VPCC offers a variety of free or low-cost community cycling programs designed to introduce the public to the sport of track cycling, including Try the Track, the spring and fall Bicycling Racing League, and Air Products Development Program.

Specifications 
The velodrome is outdoor and uncovered. The track is 1093.6 ft (333.3 m) in length with a concrete surface. The track has 30-degree banked turns and 12.5-degree straightaways. At the bottom of the track is an 8 feet (2.4 m) concrete apron. Time trial lines are painted on the track as well.

Cycling Hall of Fame 

The Lehigh Valley Velodrome houses a Cycling Hall of Fame. Members of the hall of fame include:

VeloFest 
VeloFest is the largest cycling marketplace in the United States. It's held twice a year in May and October on the infield of the Valley Preferred Cycling Center. The flea market features hundreds of vendors with thousands of cycling enthusiasts visiting each year.

References

External links 

 

1975 establishments in Pennsylvania
Buildings and structures in Lehigh County, Pennsylvania
Cycling museums and halls of fame
Halls of fame in Pennsylvania
History of cycling
Sports halls of fame
Sports venues completed in 1975
Sports venues in Pennsylvania
Velodromes in the United States